"Be Yourself" is the first single from the second album of the American rock band Audioslave, Out of Exile. The song was released in 2005 and topped the Billboard Mainstream Rock Tracks chart for seven weeks and the Modern Rock Tracks chart for four weeks in 2005.

Apart from "Like a Stone", "Be Yourself" is considered the band's most famous song, and it is still played on radio stations worldwide.

"Be Yourself" has routinely been heard in multiple media. The song is the theme music of the 2005 Raw Diva Search which was held by World Wrestling Entertainment (WWE), and it was used as the entrance music of the winner of that contest, Ashley Massaro. WWE once again used the song as one of the official theme songs to Wrestlemania XXVI. "Be Yourself" was also used in the Scrubs season six premiere episode "My Mirror Image". Along with "Your Time Has Come", the track also appeared in the documentary Warren Miller's: Higher Ground. New York Mets outfielder Shawn Green also used the song before his at-bats at games in 2006.

Prior to the vinyl release of the song, Contactmusic.com held a contest in which fans of the band could submit their pictures, over two dozen of which were selected and featured on the 7" vinyl release of the single.

Song meaning
The lyrics were inspired by events from the frontman's, Chris Cornell's, own life. "The 'be yourself' part really just came from a lot of things that I've gone through in my life and a lot of different changes and all the different tragedies and all the horrendously stupid mistakes I've made in my personal life, and wanting to be able to make up for those things and wanting to be able to not be ashamed, all that stuff," he explained. "You know, that's the one thing about getting older that's better, and this song kinda says it so simply, to a degree that 10 years ago I would've been embarrassed to put it in a song 'cause it is so simple. But there it is."

Music video
The music video was filmed in an old hotel in downtown Los Angeles and directed by music video veteran Francis Lawrence, who has directed videos for Gwen Stefani, Aerosmith, Jennifer Lopez and Will Smith and made his feature film directorial debut with Constantine. It begins with the band playing the song, a close-up of Tom Morello playing his guitar for the most part. Close-ups of Chris Cornell singing follows, along with more of Morello's guitar. The band is then shown, after the chorus, in a dark, isolated room with large windows, much like the room in their video for "Like a Stone". Close-ups of Morello during the guitar solo follow, with abstracted views of Cornell, while lights in the background change colors quickly. During the last chorus, lights in the background flash colors of red.

Cornell has said that the band modeled the concept after The Beatles' film Let It Be. He said: "If you watch Let It Be, the look of the film makes the band look like it's an important happening. I just wanted to look important, like things looked when I was a child."

This video is much like the video for "Like a Stone", since the band is only shown playing in a dark room.

Track listing
 "Be Yourself" – 4:38
 "Like a Stone" (live version)
 "Show Me How to Live" (remix by T-Ray) – 4:48
 "Be Yourself" (video) – 4:48

Imported version
 "Be Yourself" – 4:38
 "Super Stupid" (Funkadelic cover) – 3:24
 "Show Me How to Live" (remix by T-Ray) – 4:48
 "Be Yourself" (video) – 4:48

Vinyl
A. "Be Yourself" – 4:38
B. "Super Stupid" (Funkadelic cover) – 3:24

Charts

References

External links

2005 singles
Audioslave songs
Music videos directed by Francis Lawrence
Song recordings produced by Chris Cornell
Song recordings produced by Rick Rubin
Songs written by Chris Cornell
Songs written by Brad Wilk
Songs written by Tim Commerford
Songs written by Tom Morello
2004 songs